Elton Steers Mangoma is a Zimbabwean politician, and a former Minister of Economic Planning and Investment Promotion. Following the 2018 Zimbabwean General Election he is no longer a member of the House of Assembly. He currently serves as the president of the Coalition of Democrats.

Political career
Mangoma was a senior official in Morgan Tsvangirai's Movement for Democratic Change (MDC-T), and was one of the party's founding members in 1999. Before launching his political career, he was manager of several companies including Deloitte & Touche and Delta Corporation.

Election to Parliament
In 2008, Mangoma became the Movement for Democratic Change candidate for the Makoni North constituency. He was subsequently elected on 29 March in the 2008 General Election.

Minister of Economic Planning and Investment Promotion
Following the 2008–2009 political negotiations, a power sharing agreement was made between ZANU-PF led by then President Robert Mugabe and the MDC-T led by Tsvangirai. This was due to the former losing their majority in the House of Assembly. Under the agreement Tsvangirai became Prime Minister and members of his party were included in Mugabe's cabinet. As a result, Mangoma was appointed to lead the Ministry of Economic Planning and Investment Promotion.

Renewal Democrats of Zimbabwe
In 2015, Mangoma left the MDC-T and became the president of the Renewal Democrats of Zimbabwe (RDZ).

2018 general election
In 2017, a group of political parties (including the RDZ) formed an electoral bloc under the name Coalition of Democrats (CODE). The group subsequently elected Mangoma as their president on 20 October that year. As president of the bloc, Mangoma ran as their presidential candidate during the 2018 General Election campaign. As he was running for the presidency, Mangoma could not run for re-election to the House of Assembly for his constituency.

Other Roles

Prior to his political career, Mangoma was an accountant and has held positions within various corporations including:

 Deputy General Manager for Deloitte & Touche (1978–1982)
 Deputy General Manager of Agricultural Finance Corporation (1982–1983)
 Financial Manager for Colgate Palmolive (1982–1987)
 Financial Manager of Delta Corporation (1987)
 Group Finance Director for Delta Corporation (1987–1992)
 Financial Manager of Chibuku Breweries (1989–1991)
 President of the Institute of Chartered Accountants of Zimbabwe (1990)
 General Manager of Chibuku Breweries (1991–1992)
 Management Consultant of Hunyani Holdings Ltd (1992–1994)
 National Reconstruction and Development Board chairman (1995)
 Partner of Management Consultancy, Kudenga & Co (1995–1999)
 Managing Director of Corporate Excellence (2000–present)

References

External links
 Elton Steer Mangoma Profile, Africa Confidential

Members of the National Assembly of Zimbabwe
Living people
Government ministers of Zimbabwe
Movement for Democratic Change – Tsvangirai politicians
Accountants
1955 births